The 2019–20 season was Zalaegerszegi TE's 2nd competitive season, 40th consecutive season in the OTP Bank Liga and 100th year in existence as a football club.

Transfers

Summer

In:

Out:

Source:

Nemzeti Bajnokság I

League table

Results summary

Results by round

Matches

Hungarian Cup

Statistics

Appearances and goals
Last updated on 15 May 2021.

|-
|colspan="14"|Youth players:

|}

Top scorers
Includes all competitive matches. The list is sorted by shirt number when total goals are equal.
Last updated on 15 May 2021

Disciplinary record
Includes all competitive matches. Players with 1 card or more included only.

Last updated on 15 May 2021

Overall
{|class="wikitable"
|-
|Games played || 20 (18 OTP Bank Liga and 2 Hungarian Cup)
|-
|Games won || 8 (6 OTP Bank Liga and 2 Hungarian Cup)
|-
|Games drawn || 4 (4 OTP Bank Liga and 0 Hungarian Cup)
|-
|Games lost || 8 (8 OTP Bank Liga and 0 Hungarian Cup)
|-
|Goals scored || 48
|-
|Goals conceded || 35
|-
|Goal difference || +13
|-
|Yellow cards || 35
|-
|Red cards || 2
|-
|rowspan="2"|Worst discipline ||  Dániel Szalai (3 , 1 )
|-
|  Zoran Lesjak (3 , 1 )
|-
|rowspan="1"|Best result || 11–0 (A) v Mezőkeresztes - Hungarian Cup - 19-9-2020
|-
|rowspan="3"|Worst result || 2–4 (H) v Budapest Honvéd - Nemzeti Bajnokság I - 4-10-2020
|-
| 1–3 (A) v Paks - Nemzeti Bajnokság I - 18-10-2020
|-
| 1–3 (H) v Budafok - Nemzeti Bajnokság I - 25-10-2020
|-
|rowspan="2"|Most appearances ||  Dávid Bobál (20 appearances)
|-
|  Bence Gergényi (20 appearances)
|-
|rowspan="1"|Top scorer ||  Márk Koszta (7 goals)
|-
|Points || 28/60 (43.58%)
|-

References

External links
 Official Website
 UEFA
 fixtures and results

Zalaegerszegi TE seasons
Hungarian football clubs 2020–21 season